This bibliography of Harry S. Truman is a selective list of scholarly works about Harry S. Truman, the thirty-third president of the United States (1945–1953). See also the bibliographies at Harry S. Truman, Presidency of Harry S. Truman, and Foreign policy of the Harry S. Truman administration.

Historiography
 Catsam, Derek. "The civil rights movement and the Presidency in the hot years of the Cold War: A historical and historiographical assessment." History Compass 6.1 (2008): 314-344 online.

 Griffith, Robert. "Truman and the Historians: The Reconstruction of Postwar American History." Wisconsin Magazine of History (1975) 59#1 pp: 20-47, covers both foreign and domestic policy. online[

 Kirkendall, Richard S.  Harry S. Truman Encyclopedia (1990)
  614pp; 27 essays by scholars focusing on historiography
 Kirkendall, Richard S. ed.  Harry's Farewell: Interpreting and Teaching the Truman Presidency (2004) essays by scholars
 Levantrosser, William F. ed. Harry S. Truman: The Man from Independence (1986). 25 essays by scholars and Truman aides.
 McNay, John T. "The vibrant era from the depression to the cold war: the rich historiography of the Roosevelt and Truman years." Presidential Studies Quarterly 46.1 (2016): 208-212.

Biographical

  about a 1953 vacation trip covered by the media
 
 
 
 
 
 
 
 

 
 Hamby, Alonzo L. Man of the People: A Life of Harry S. Truman (1995)
 
 
 
  about the early and enduring influence of Freemasonry on his life and career

Foreign policy

 
 
 Divine, Robert A.  "The Cold War and the Election of 1948," The Journal of American History, Vol. 59, No. 1 (Jun. 1972), pp. 90–110 in JSTOR
 
 Gaddis, John Lewis. "Reconsiderations: Was the Truman Doctrine a Real Turning Point?" Foreign Affairs 1974 52(2): 386–402. ISSN 0015-7120
 
 Hasegawa, Tsuyoshi. Racing the Enemy: Stalin, Truman, and the Surrender of Japan (2009)
 Heiss, Mary Ann, and Michael J. Hogan, eds. Origins of the National Security State and the Legacy of Harry S. Truman (Kirksville: Truman State University Press, 2015(. xvi, 240 pp.
 Ivie, Robert L. "Fire, Flood, and Red Fever: Motivating Metaphors of Global Emergency in the Truman Doctrine Speech." Presidential Studies Quarterly 1999 29(3): 570–591. ISSN 0360-4918
 Judis, John B.: Genesis: Truman, American Jews, and the Origins of the Arab/Israeli Conflict. Farrar, Straus & Giroux, 2014. 
 
 Lacey, Michael J. ed. The Truman Presidency (1989)
 
 Maddox, R. J. (1987). Truman, Poland, and the Origins of the Cold War. Presidential Studies Quarterly, 17(1), 27–41. 
 Matray, James. "Truman's Plan for Victory: National Self Determination and the Thirty-Eighth Parallel Decision in Korea," Journal of American History 66 (September 1979), 314–333. in JSTOR
 Matray, James I. Northeast Asia and the Legacy of Harry S. Truman: Japan, China, and the Two Koreas (2012)
 Merrill, Dennis. "The Truman Doctrine: Containing Communism and Modernity" Presidential Studies Quarterly 2006 36(1): 27–37. ISSN 0360-4918
 Offner, Arnold A. "'Another Such Victory': President Truman, American Foreign Policy, and the Cold War." Diplomatic History 1999 23(2): 127–155. ISSN 0145-2096
 Pelz, Stephen.  "When the Kitchen Gets Hot, Pass the Buck: Truman and Korea in 1950," Reviews in American History 6 (December 1978), 548–555. Online at Project MUSE
 Pierpaoli Jr., Paul G.  Truman and Korea: The Political Culture of the Early Cold War.  (University of Missouri Press, 1999)
 
 Smith,  Geoffrey S. "'Harry, We Hardly Know You': Revisionism, Politics and Diplomacy, 1945–1954," American Political Science Review 70 (June 1976), 560–582. Online at JSTOR
 
 Wainstock, Dennis D. Truman, MacArthur, and the Korean War (1999)
 Walker, J. Samuel. Prompt and Utter Destruction: Truman and the Use of Atomic Bombs against Japan (1997)

 Walker, J. Samuel. "Recent Literature on Truman's Atomic Bomb Decision: A Search for Middle Ground" Diplomatic History April 2005 – Vol. 29 Issue 2 Pp 311–334

Politics and domestic issues
 Berman, William C. The politics of civil rights in the Truman administration (1970) online
 
  reprinted in Hamby 1974, pp. 52–68.
 Bolles, Blair (1952), How to Get Rich in Washington:  Rich Man's Division of the Welfare State, New York:  Norton.
 

 Brooks, Karl Boyd, ed. The Environmental Legacy of Harry S. Truman, (Kirksville: Truman State University Press, 2009. xxxvi, 145 pp. 
 Dean, Virgil W. "Why not the Brannan plan?." Agricultural History (1996): 268–282. in JSTOR, on agriculture
 Daynes, Byron W. and Glen Sussman, White House Politics and the Environment: Franklin D. Roosevelt to George W. Bush (2010) pp 36–45.

 
 
 Gardner, Michael R. Harry Truman and Civil Rights: Moral Courage and Political Risks. Southern Illinois University Press, 2002. xx + 276 pp. . online review

 Hartmann, Susan M. Truman and the 80th Congress (1971)
 Heller, Francis H.  Economics and the Truman Administration (1981)
 Koenig, Louis W. The Truman Administration: Its Principles and Practice (1956)
 Lacey, Michael J. ed. The Truman Presidency (1989)
 Lee, R. Alton; Truman and Taft-Hartley: A Question of Mandate. (University of Kentucky Press, 1966)
 Marcus, Maeva Truman and the Steel Seizure Case: The Limits of Presidential Power (1994)
 Matusow, Allen J. Farm policies and politics in the Truman years (Harvard University Press, 1967).
 Parmet, Herbert S. The Democrats: The Years After FDR (Oxford University Press, 1976)
 Pietrusza, David (2011), 1948: Harry Truman's Improbable Victory and the Year that Changed America, New York: Union Square Press.
 Richardson, Elmo. Dams, Parks and Politics: Resource Development and Preservation the Truman-Eisenhower Era (1973).

 Ryan, Halford R. Harry S. Truman: Presidential Rhetoric (1993)
 Savage, Sean J. Truman and the Democratic Party (1997).
 Schoenebaum, Eleanora W. ed. Political Profiles: The Truman Years (1978) 715pp; short biographies of 435 players in national politics 1945–1952.
 Sitkoff, Harvard. "Harry Truman and the election of 1948: The coming of age of civil rights in American politics." Journal of Southern History 37.4 (1971): 597-616 online.

 Theoharis,  Athan. The Truman Presidency: The Origins of the Imperial Presidency and the National Security State (1979).

Primary sources
 Avner, Yehuda The Prime Ministers: An Intimate Narrative of Israeli Leadership (2010) (Chapter 9,  A Walk with Harry Truman) 
 
 Bernstein, Barton J., Ed. The Truman Administration: A Documentary History (1966); 2nd edition published as Politics and Policies of the Truman Administration (1970).
 
 Merrill, Dennis. ed. Documentary History of the Truman Presidency, (1995– ) 35 volumes; available in some large academic libraries.
 Miller, Merle Plain Speaking: An Oral Biography of Harry S. Truman (1974) Putnam Publishing Group. . London: Gollancz Ltd. (1974)  (Reprint (2005) by Black Dog & Leventhal Publishers. )
 Neal, Steve ed. Miracle of '48: Harry Truman's Major Campaign Speeches & Selected Whistle-Stops (2003)
 
 
 
 
 
 
 Truman, Margaret. Harry S. Truman. William Morrow and Co. (1973). memoir by his daughter

Online sources

Audio and video sources
 29 Audio/Video Clips of Harry Truman
 Audio clips of Truman's speeches

Truman on US postage stamps

Other bibliographies
 Annotated bibliography for Harry S. Truman from the Alsos Digital Library for Nuclear Issues
 Bibliography of World War II

References

External links

 Booknotes interview with Zachary Karabell on The Last Campaign: How Harry Truman Won the 1948 Election, June 4, 2000.
 Booknotes interview with Steve Neal on Harry and Ike: The Partnership That Remade the Postwar World, February 10, 2002.

Truman
Harry S. Truman-related lists
Truman
Truman, Harry